Tarasikha is a rural locality (a village) in Plesetsky District, Arkhangelsk Oblast, Russia. The population was 1 as of 2010.

Geography 
Tarasikha is located 115 km east of Plesetsk (the district's administrative centre) by road. Monastyr is the nearest rural locality.

References 

Rural localities in Plesetsky District